The  (Latin for "British Encyclopædia") is a general knowledge English-language encyclopædia. It is published by Encyclopædia Britannica, Inc.; the company has existed since the 18th century, although it has changed ownership various times through the centuries. The encyclopaedia is maintained by about 100 full-time editors and more than 4,000 contributors. The 2010 version of the 15th edition, which spans 32 volumes and 32,640 pages, was the last printed edition. Since 2016, it has been published exclusively as an online encyclopaedia.

Printed for 244 years, the Britannica was the longest running in-print encyclopaedia in the English language. It was first published between 1768 and 1771 in the Scottish capital of Edinburgh, as three volumes. The encyclopaedia grew in size: the second edition was 10 volumes, and by its fourth edition (1801–1810) it had expanded to 20 volumes. Its rising stature as a scholarly work helped recruit eminent contributors, and the 9th (1875–1889) and 11th editions (1911) are landmark encyclopaedias for scholarship and literary style. Starting with the 11th edition and following its acquisition by an American firm, the Britannica shortened and simplified articles to broaden its appeal to the North American market. In 1933, the Britannica became the first encyclopaedia to adopt "continuous revision", in which the encyclopaedia is continually reprinted, with every article updated on a schedule. In March 2012, Encyclopædia Britannica, Inc. announced it would no longer publish printed editions and would focus instead on the online version.

The 15th edition has a three-part structure: a 12-volume  of short articles (generally fewer than 750 words), a 17-volume  of long articles (two to 310 pages), and a single  volume to give a hierarchical outline of knowledge. Over 70 years, the size of the Britannica has remained steady, with about 40 million words on half a million topics. Though published in the United States since 1901, the Britannica has for the most part maintained British English spelling.

Present status

Print version 

The 2007  has 699 in-depth articles, ranging in length from 2 to 310 pages and having references and named contributors. In contrast, the 2007  has roughly 65,000 articles, the vast majority (about 97%) of which contain fewer than 750 words, no references, and no named contributors. The  articles are meant both as authoritative, well-written articles on their subjects and as storehouses of information not covered elsewhere. The longest article (310 pages) is on the United States, and resulted from the merger of the articles on the individual states. A 2013 "Global Edition" of Britannica contained approximately forty thousand articles.

The Outline is also intended to be a study guide, to put subjects in their proper perspective, and to suggest a series of Britannica articles for the student wishing to learn a topic in depth. However, libraries have found that it is scarcely used, and reviewers have recommended that it be dropped from the encyclopaedia. The  also has color transparencies of human anatomy and several appendices listing the staff members, advisors, and contributors to all three parts of the Britannica.

The two-volume index has 2,350 pages, listing the 228,274 topics covered in the Britannica, together with 474,675 subentries under those topics. The Britannica generally prefers British spelling over American; for example, it uses colour (not color), centre (not center), and encyclopaedia (not encyclopedia). However, there are exceptions to this rule, such as defense rather than defence. Common alternative spellings are provided with cross-references such as "Color: see Colour."

Since 1936, the articles of the Britannica have been revised on a regular schedule, with at least 10% of them considered for revision each year. According to one Britannica website, 46% of its articles were revised over the past three years; however, according to another Britannica website, only 35% of the articles were revised.

Diacritical marks and non-English letters are ignored, while numerical entries such as "1812, War of" are alphabetized as if the number had been written out ("Eighteen-twelve, War of"). Articles with identical names are ordered first by persons, then by places, then by things. Rulers with identical names are organized first alphabetically by country and then by chronology; thus, Charles III of France precedes Charles I of England, listed in Britannica as the ruler of Great Britain and Ireland. (That is, they are alphabetized as if their titles were "Charles, France, 3" and "Charles, Great Britain and Ireland, 1".) Similarly, places that share names are organized alphabetically by country, then by ever-smaller political divisions.

In March 2012, the company announced that the 2010 edition would be the last printed version. This was announced as a move by the company to adapt to the times and focus on its future using digital distribution. The peak year for the printed encyclopaedia was 1990 when 120,000 sets were sold, but it dropped to 40,000 in 1996. 12,000 sets of the 2010 edition were printed, of which 8,000 had been sold . By late April 2012, the remaining copies of the 2010 edition had sold out at Britannica's online store. , a replica of Britannica's 1768 first edition is sold on the online store.

Related printed material 
Britannica Junior was first published in 1934 as 12 volumes. It was expanded to 15 volumes in 1947, and renamed Britannica Junior Encyclopædia in 1963. It was taken off the market after the 1984 printing.

A British Children's Britannica edited by John Armitage was issued in London in 1960. Its contents were determined largely by the eleven-plus standardized tests given in Britain. Britannica introduced the Children's Britannica to the US market in 1988, aimed at ages seven to 14.

In 1961, a 16 volume Young Children's Encyclopaedia was issued for children just learning to read.

My First Britannica is aimed at children ages six to 12, and the Britannica Discovery Library is for children aged three to six (issued 1974 to 1991).

There have been, and are, several abridged Britannica encyclopaedias. The single-volume Britannica Concise Encyclopædia has 28,000 short articles condensing the larger 32-volume Britannica; there are authorized translations in languages such as Chinese and Vietnamese. Compton's by Britannica, first published in 2007, incorporating the former Compton's Encyclopedia, is aimed at 10- to 17-year-olds and consists of 26 volumes and 11,000 pages.

Since 1938, Encyclopædia Britannica, Inc. has published annually a Book of the Year covering the past year's events. A given edition of the Book of the Year is named in terms of the year of its publication, though the edition actually covers the events of the previous year. The company also publishes several specialized reference works, such as Shakespeare: The Essential Guide to the Life and Works of the Bard (Wiley, 2006).

Optical disc, online, and mobile versions 
The Britannica Ultimate Reference Suite 2012 DVD contains over 100,000 articles. This includes regular Britannica articles, as well as others drawn from the Britannica Student Encyclopædia, and the Britannica Elementary Encyclopædia. The package includes a range of supplementary content including maps, videos, sound clips, animations and web links. It also offers study tools and dictionary and thesaurus entries from Merriam-Webster.

Britannica Online is a website with more than 120,000 articles and is updated regularly. It has daily features, updates and links to news reports from The New York Times and the BBC. , roughly 60% of Encyclopædia Britannica's revenue came from online operations, of which around 15% came from subscriptions to the consumer version of the websites. , subscriptions were available on a yearly, monthly or weekly basis. Special subscription plans are offered to schools, colleges and libraries; such institutional subscribers constitute an important part of Britannica's business. Beginning in early 2007, the Britannica made articles freely available if they are hyperlinked from an external site. Non-subscribers are served pop-ups and advertising.

On 20 February 2007, Encyclopædia Britannica, Inc. announced that it was working with mobile phone search company AskMeNow to launch a mobile encyclopaedia. Users will be able to send a question via text message, and AskMeNow will search Britannica 28,000-article concise encyclopaedia to return an answer to the query. Daily topical features sent directly to users' mobile phones are also planned.

On 3 June 2008, an initiative to facilitate collaboration between online expert and amateur scholarly contributors for Britannica's online content (in the spirit of a wiki), with editorial oversight from Britannica staff, was announced. Approved contributions would be credited, though contributing automatically grants Encyclopædia Britannica, Inc. perpetual, irrevocable license to those contributions.

On 22 January 2009, Britannica's president, Jorge Cauz, announced that the company would be accepting edits and additions to the online Britannica website from the public. The published edition of the encyclopaedia will not be affected by the changes. Individuals wishing to edit the Britannica website will have to register under their real name and address prior to editing or submitting their content. All edits submitted will be reviewed and checked and will have to be approved by the encyclopaedia's professional staff. Contributions from non-academic users will sit in a separate section from the expert-generated Britannica content, as will content submitted by non-Britannica scholars. Articles written by users, if vetted and approved, will also only be available in a special section of the website, separate from the professional articles. Official Britannica material would carry a "Britannica Checked" stamp, to distinguish it from the user-generated content.

On 14 September 2010, Encyclopædia Britannica, Inc. announced a partnership with mobile phone development company Concentric Sky to launch a series of iPhone products aimed at the K-12 market. On 20 July 2011, Encyclopædia Britannica, Inc. announced that Concentric Sky had ported the Britannica Kids product line to Intel's Intel Atom-based Netbooks and on 26 October 2011 that it had launched its encyclopedia as an iPad app. In 2010, Britannica released Britannica ImageQuest, a database of images.

In March 2012, it was announced that the company would cease printing the encyclopaedia set, and that it would focus more on its online version.

On 7 June 2018, Britannica released a Google Chrome extension, Britannica Insights, which shows snippets of information from Britannica Online in a sidebar for Google Search results. The Britannica sidebar does not replace Google's sidebar and is instead placed above Google's sidebar. Britannica Insights was also available as a Firefox extension but this was taken down due to a code review issue.

Personnel and management

Contributors 
The print version of the Britannica has 4,411 contributors, many eminent in their fields, such as Nobel laureate economist Milton Friedman, astronomer Carl Sagan, and surgeon Michael DeBakey. Roughly a quarter of the contributors are deceased, some as long ago as 1947 (Alfred North Whitehead), while another quarter are retired or emeritus. Most (approximately 98%) contribute to only a single article; however, 64 contributed to three articles, 23 contributed to four articles, 10 contributed to five articles, and 8 contributed to more than five articles. An exceptionally prolific contributor is Christine Sutton of the University of Oxford, who contributed 24 articles on particle physics.

While Britannica authors have included writers such as Albert Einstein, Marie Curie, and Leon Trotsky, as well as notable independent encyclopaedists such as Isaac Asimov, some have been criticized for lack of expertise. In 1911 the historian George L. Burr wrote:

Staff 

 in the fifteenth edition of Britannica, Dale Hoiberg, a sinologist, was listed as Britannica Senior Vice President and editor-in-chief. Among his predecessors as editors-in-chief were Hugh Chisholm (1902–1924), James Louis Garvin (1926–1932), Franklin Henry Hooper (1932–1938), Walter Yust (1938–1960), Harry Ashmore (1960–1963), Warren E. Preece (1964–1968, 1969–1975), Sir William Haley (1968–1969), Philip W. Goetz (1979–1991), and Robert McHenry (1992–1997).  Anita Wolff was listed as the Deputy Editor and Theodore Pappas as Executive Editor. Prior Executive Editors include John V. Dodge (1950–1964) and Philip W. Goetz.

Paul T. Armstrong remains the longest working employee of Encyclopædia Britannica. He began his career there in 1934, eventually earning the positions of treasurer, vice president, and chief financial officer in his 58 years with the company, before retiring in 1992.

The 2007 editorial staff of the Britannica included five Senior Editors and nine Associate Editors, supervised by Dale Hoiberg and four others.

Editorial advisors 
The Britannica has an editorial board of advisors, which includes 12 distinguished scholars: non-fiction author Nicholas Carr, religion scholar Wendy Doniger, political economist Benjamin M. Friedman, Council on Foreign Relations President Emeritus Leslie H. Gelb, computer scientist David Gelernter, Physics Nobel laureate Murray Gell-Mann, Carnegie Corporation of New York President Vartan Gregorian, philosopher Thomas Nagel, cognitive scientist Donald Norman, musicologist Don Michael Randel, Stewart Sutherland, Baron Sutherland of Houndwood, President of the Royal Society of Edinburgh, and cultural anthropologist Michael Wesch.

The Propædia and its Outline of Knowledge were produced by dozens of editorial advisors under the direction of Mortimer J. Adler. Roughly half of these advisors have since died, including some of the Outline's chief architects – Rene Dubos (d. 1982), Loren Eiseley (d. 1977), Harold D. Lasswell (d. 1978), Mark Van Doren (d. 1972), Peter Ritchie Calder (d. 1982) and Mortimer J. Adler (d. 2001). The  also lists just under 4,000 advisors who were consulted for the unsigned  articles.

Corporate structure 
In January 1996, the Britannica was purchased from the Benton Foundation by billionaire Swiss financier Jacqui Safra, who serves as its current chair of the board. In 1997, Don Yannias, a long-time associate and investment advisor of Safra, became CEO of Encyclopædia Britannica, Inc. In 1999, a new company, Britannica.com Inc., was created to develop digital versions of the Britannica; Yannias assumed the role of CEO in the new company, while his former position at the parent company remained vacant for two years. Yannias' tenure at Britannica.com Inc. was marked by missteps, considerable lay-offs, and financial losses. In 2001, Yannias was replaced by Ilan Yeshua, who reunited the leadership of the two companies. Yannias later returned to investment management, but remains on the Britannica Board of Directors.

In 2003, former management consultant Jorge Aguilar-Cauz was appointed President of Encyclopædia Britannica, Inc. Cauz is the senior executive and reports directly to the Britannica Board of Directors. Cauz has been pursuing alliances with other companies and extending the Britannica brand to new educational and reference products, continuing the strategy pioneered by former CEO Elkan Harrison Powell in the mid-1930s.

Under Safra's ownership, the company has experienced financial difficulties and has responded by reducing the price of its products and implementing drastic cost cuts. According to a 2003 report in the New York Post, the Britannica management has eliminated employee 401(k) accounts and encouraged the use of free images. These changes have had negative impacts, as freelance contributors have waited up to six months for checks and the Britannica staff have gone years without pay rises.

In the fall of 2017, Karthik Krishnan was appointed global chief executive officer of the Encyclopædia Britannica Group. Krishnan brought a varied perspective to the role based on several high-level positions in digital media, including RELX (formerly known as Reed Elsevier, and one of the constituents of the FTSE 100 Index) and Rodale, in which he was responsible for "driving business and cultural transformation and accelerating growth".

Taking the reins of the company as it was preparing to mark its 250th anniversary and define the next phase of its digital strategy for consumers and K-12 schools, Krishnan launched a series of new initiatives in his first year.

First was Britannica Insights, a free, downloadable software extension to the Google Chrome browser that served up edited, fact-checked Britannica information with queries on search engines such as Google, Yahoo, and Bing. Its purpose, the company said, was to "provide trusted, verified information" in conjunction with search results that were thought to be increasingly unreliable in the era of misinformation and "fake news."

The product was quickly followed by Britannica School Insights, which provided similar content for subscribers to Britannica's online classroom solutions, and a partnership with YouTube in which verified Britannica content appeared on the site as an antidote to user-generated video content that could be false or misleading.  

Krishnan, himself an educator at New York University's Stern School of Business, believes in the "transformative power of education" and set steering the company toward solidifying its place among leaders in educational technology and supplemental curriculum. Krishnan aimed at providing more useful and relevant solutions to customer needs, extending and renewing Britannica's historical emphasis on "Utility", which had been the watchword of its first edition in 1768.

Krishnan also is active in civic affairs, with organizations such as the Urban Enterprise Initiative and Urban Upbound, whose board he serves on.

Competition 
As the Britannica is a general encyclopaedia, it does not seek to compete with specialized encyclopaedias such as the Encyclopaedia of Mathematics or the Dictionary of the Middle Ages, which can devote much more space to their chosen topics. In its first years, the Britannica main competitor was the general encyclopaedia of Ephraim Chambers and, soon thereafter, Rees's Cyclopædia and Coleridge's Encyclopædia Metropolitana. In the 20th century, successful competitors included Collier's Encyclopedia, the Encyclopedia Americana, and the World Book Encyclopedia. Nevertheless, from the 9th edition onwards, the Britannica was widely considered to have the greatest authority of any general English-language encyclopaedia, especially because of its broad coverage and eminent authors. The print version of the Britannica was significantly more expensive than its competitors.

Since the early 1990s, the Britannica has faced new challenges from digital information sources. The Internet, facilitated by the development of Web search engines, has grown into a common source of information for many people, and provides easy access to reliable original sources and expert opinions, thanks in part to initiatives such as Google Books, MIT's release of its educational materials and the open PubMed Central library of the National Library of Medicine. In general, the Internet tends to provide more current coverage than print media, due to the ease with which material on the Internet can be updated. In rapidly changing fields such as science, technology, politics, culture and modern history, the Britannica has struggled to stay up to date, a problem first analysed systematically by its former editor Walter Yust. Eventually, the Britannica turned to focus more on its online edition.

Print encyclopaedias 
The  has been compared with other print encyclopaedias, both qualitatively and quantitatively. A well-known comparison is that of Kenneth Kister, who gave a qualitative and quantitative comparison of the 1993 Britannica with two comparable encyclopaedias, Collier's Encyclopedia and the Encyclopedia Americana. For the quantitative analysis, ten articles were selected at random—circumcision, Charles Drew, Galileo, Philip Glass, heart disease, IQ, panda bear, sexual harassment, Shroud of Turin and Uzbekistan—and letter grades of A–D or F were awarded in four categories: coverage, accuracy, clarity, and recency. In all four categories and for all three encyclopaedias, the four average grades fell between B− and B+, chiefly because none of the encyclopaedias had an article on sexual harassment in 1994. In the accuracy category, the Britannica received one "D" and seven "A"s, Encyclopedia Americana received eight "A"s, and Collier's received one "D" and seven "A"s; thus, Britannica received an average score of 92% for accuracy to Americana 95% and Collier's 92%. In the timeliness category, Britannica averaged an 86% to Americana'''s 90% and Collier's 85%.

In 2013, the President of Encyclopædia Britannica announced that after 244 years, the encyclopedia would cease print production and all future editions would be entirely digital.

 Digital encyclopaedias on optical media 
The most notable competitor of the Britannica among CD/DVD-ROM digital encyclopaedias was Encarta, now discontinued, a modern, multimedia encyclopaedia that incorporated three print encyclopaedias: Funk & Wagnalls, Collier's and the New Merit Scholar's Encyclopedia. Encarta was the top-selling multimedia encyclopaedia, based on total US retail sales from January 2000 to February 2006. Both occupied the same price range, with the 2007 Encyclopædia Britannica Ultimate CD or DVD costing US$40–50 and the Microsoft Encarta Premium 2007 DVD costing US$45. The Britannica contains 100,000 articles and Merriam-Webster's Dictionary and Thesaurus (US only), and offers Primary and Secondary School editions. Encarta contained 66,000 articles, a user-friendly Visual Browser, interactive maps, math, language and homework tools, a US and UK dictionary, and a youth edition. Like Encarta, the Britannica has been criticized for being biased towards United States audiences; the United Kingdom-related articles are updated less often, maps of the United States are more detailed than those of other countries, and it lacks a UK dictionary. Like the Britannica, Encarta was available online by subscription, although some content could be accessed free.

 Wikipedia 
The main online alternative to Britannica is Wikipedia. The key differences between the two lie in accessibility; the model of participation they bring to an encyclopedic project; their respective style sheets and editorial policies; relative ages; the number of subjects treated; the number of languages in which articles are written and made available; and their underlying economic models: unlike Britannica, Wikipedia is a not-for-profit and is not connected with traditional profit- and contract-based publishing distribution networks.

The 699 printed  articles are generally written by identified contributors, and the roughly 65,000 printed  articles are the work of the editorial staff and identified outside consultants. Thus, a Britannica article either has known authorship or a set of possible authors (the editorial staff). With the exception of the editorial staff, most of the Britannica contributors are experts in their field—some are Nobel laureates. By contrast, the articles of Wikipedia are written by people of unknown degrees of expertise: most do not claim any particular expertise, and of those who do, many are anonymous and have no verifiable credentials. It is for this lack of institutional vetting, or certification, that former Britannica editor-in-chief Robert McHenry notes his belief that Wikipedia cannot hope to rival the Britannica in accuracy.

In 2005, the journal Nature chose articles from both websites in a wide range of science topics and sent them to what it called "relevant" field experts for peer review. The experts then compared the competing articles—one from each site on a given topic—side by side but were not told which article came from which site. Nature got back 42 usable reviews.

In the end, the journal found just eight serious errors, such as general misunderstandings of vital concepts: four from each site. It also discovered many factual errors, omissions or misleading statements: 162 in Wikipedia and 123 in Britannica, an average of 3.86 mistakes per article for Wikipedia and 2.92 for Britannica. 

Although Britannica was revealed as the more accurate encyclopedia, with fewer errors, Encyclopædia Britannica, Inc. in its rebuttal called Nature's study flawed and misleading and called for a "prompt" retraction. It noted that two of the articles in the study were taken from a Britannica yearbook and not the encyclopaedia, and another two were from Compton's Encyclopedia (called the Britannica Student Encyclopedia on the company's website). Nature defended its story and declined to retract, stating that, as it was comparing Wikipedia with the web version of Britannica, it used whatever relevant material was available on Britannica website. Interviewed in February 2009, the managing director of Britannica UK said: In a January 2016 press release, Britannica called Wikipedia "an impressive achievement."

 Critical and popular assessments 
 Reputation 

Since the 3rd edition, the Britannica has enjoyed a popular and critical reputation for general excellence. The 3rd and the 9th editions were pirated for sale in the United States, beginning with Dobson's Encyclopaedia. On the release of the 14th edition, Time magazine dubbed the Britannica the "Patriarch of the Library". In a related advertisement, naturalist William Beebe was quoted as saying that the Britannica was "beyond comparison because there is no competitor." References to the Britannica can be found throughout English literature, most notably in one of Sir Arthur Conan Doyle's favourite Sherlock Holmes stories, "The Red-Headed League". The tale was highlighted by the Lord Mayor of London, Gilbert Inglefield, at the bicentennial of the Britannica.

The Britannica has a reputation for summarising knowledge. To further their education, some people have devoted themselves to reading the entire Britannica, taking anywhere from three to 22 years to do so. When Fat'h Ali became the Shah of Persia in 1797, he was given a set of the Britannica 3rd edition, which he read completely; after this feat, he extended his royal title to include "Most Formidable Lord and Master of the ". Writer George Bernard Shaw claimed to have read the complete 9th edition—except for the science articles—and Richard Evelyn Byrd took the Britannica as reading material for his five-month stay at the South Pole in 1934, while Philip Beaver read it during a sailing expedition. More recently, A.J. Jacobs, an editor at Esquire magazine, read the entire 2002 version of the 15th edition, describing his experiences in the well-received 2004 book, The Know-It-All: One Man's Humble Quest to Become the Smartest Person in the World. Only two people are known to have read two independent editions: the author C. S. Forester and Amos Urban Shirk, an American businessman who read the 11th and 14th editions, devoting roughly three hours per night for four and a half years to read the 11th.

 Awards 
The CD/DVD-ROM version of the Britannica, Encyclopædia Britannica Ultimate Reference Suite, received the 2004 Distinguished Achievement Award from the Association of Educational Publishers. On 15 July 2009,  was awarded a spot as one of "Top Ten Superbrands in the UK" by a panel of more than 2,000 independent reviewers, as reported by the BBC.

 Coverage of topics 
Topics are chosen in part by reference to the  "Outline of Knowledge". The bulk of the Britannica is devoted to geography (26% of the ), biography (14%), biology and medicine (11%), literature (7%), physics and astronomy (6%), religion (5%), art (4%), Western philosophy (4%), and law (3%). A complementary study of the  found that geography accounted for 25% of articles, science 18%, social sciences 17%, biography 17%, and all other humanities 25%. Writing in 1992, one reviewer judged that the "range, depth, and catholicity of coverage [of the Britannica] are unsurpassed by any other general Encyclopaedia."

The Britannica does not cover topics in equivalent detail; for example, the whole of Buddhism and most other religions is covered in a single  article, whereas 14 articles are devoted to Christianity, comprising nearly half of all religion articles. However, the Britannica has been lauded as the least biased of general Encyclopaedias marketed to Western readers and praised for its biographies of important women of all eras.

 Criticism of editorial decisions 
On rare occasions, the Britannica has been criticized for its editorial choices. Given its roughly constant size, the encyclopaedia has needed to reduce or eliminate some topics to accommodate others, resulting in controversial decisions. The initial 15th edition (1974–1985) was faulted for having reduced or eliminated coverage of children's literature, military decorations, and the French poet Joachim du Bellay; editorial mistakes were also alleged, such as inconsistent sorting of Japanese biographies. Summing up, one critic called the initial 15th edition a "qualified failure...[that] cares more for juggling its format than for preserving." More recently, reviewers from the American Library Association were surprised to find that most educational articles had been eliminated from the 1992 , along with the article on psychology.

Some very few Britannica-appointed contributors are mistaken. A notorious instance from the Britannica early years is the rejection of Newtonian gravity by George Gleig, the chief editor of the 3rd edition (1788–1797), who wrote that gravity was caused by the classical element of fire. The Britannica has also staunchly defended a scientific approach to cultural topics, as it did with William Robertson Smith's articles on religion in the 9th edition, particularly his article stating that the Bible was not historically accurate (1875).

 Other criticisms 
The Britannica has received criticism, especially as editions become outdated. It is expensive to produce a completely new edition of the Britannica, and its editors delay for as long as fiscally sensible (usually about 25 years). For example, despite continuous revision, the 14th edition became outdated after 35 years (1929–1964). When American physicist Harvey Einbinder detailed its failings in his 1964 book, The Myth of the Britannica, the encyclopaedia was provoked to produce the 15th edition, which required 10 years of work. It is still difficult to keep the Britannica current; one 1994 critic writes, "it is not difficult to find articles that are out-of-date or in need of revision", noting that the longer  articles are more likely to be outdated than the shorter  articles. The bibliographies of the  articles have been criticized for being more out-of-date than the articles themselves.

In 2005, 12-year-old schoolboy Lucian George found several inaccuracies in the Britannica entries on Poland and wildlife in Eastern Europe.

In 2010, an inaccurate entry about the Irish Civil War was discussed in the Irish press following a decision of the Department of Education and Science to pay for online access.Sheehy, Clodagh (4 February 2010). "Are they taking the Mick? It's the encyclopedia that thinks the Civil War was between the north and south" . Evening Herald (Dublin).

Writing about the 3rd edition (1788–1797), Britannica chief editor George Gleig observed that "perfection seems to be incompatible with the nature of works constructed on such a plan, and embracing such a variety of subjects." In March 2006, the Britannica wrote, "we in no way mean to imply that Britannica is error-free; we have never made such a claim" (although in 1962 Britannica's sales department famously said of the 14th edition "It is truth. It is unquestionable fact.") The sentiment is expressed by its original editor, William Smellie:

However, Jorge Cauz (president of Encyclopædia Britannica Inc.) asserted in 2012 that "Britannica [...] will always be factually correct."

 History 

Past owners have included, in chronological order, the Edinburgh, Scotland printers Colin Macfarquhar and Andrew Bell, Scottish bookseller Archibald Constable, Scottish publisher A & C Black, Horace Everett Hooper, Sears Roebuck and William Benton.

The present owner of Encyclopædia Britannica Inc. is Jacqui Safra, a Brazilian billionaire and actor. Recent advances in information technology and the rise of electronic encyclopaedias such as Encyclopædia Britannica Ultimate Reference Suite, Encarta and Wikipedia have reduced the demand for print encyclopaedias. To remain competitive, Encyclopædia Britannica, Inc. has stressed the reputation of the Britannica, reduced its price and production costs, and developed electronic versions on CD-ROM, DVD, and the World Wide Web. Since the early 1930s, the company has promoted spin-off reference works.

 Editions 
The Britannica has been issued in 15 editions, with multi-volume supplements to the 3rd and 4th editions (see the Table below). The 5th and 6th editions were reprints of the 4th, and the 10th edition was only a supplement to the 9th, just as the 12th and 13th editions were supplements to the 11th. The 15th underwent massive reorganization in 1985, but the updated, current version is still known as the 15th. The 14th and 15th editions were edited every year throughout their runs, so that later printings of each were entirely different from early ones.

Throughout history, the Britannica has had two aims: to be an excellent reference book, and to provide educational material. In 1974, the 15th edition adopted a third goal: to systematize all human knowledge. The history of the Britannica can be divided into five eras, punctuated by changes in management, or reorganization of the dictionary.

 1768–1826 

In the first era (1st–6th editions, 1768–1826), the Britannica was managed and published by its founders, Colin Macfarquhar and Andrew Bell, by Archibald Constable, and by others. The Britannica was first published between December 1768 and 1771 in Edinburgh as the Encyclopædia Britannica, or, A Dictionary of Arts and Sciences, compiled upon a New Plan. In part, it was conceived in reaction to the French Encyclopédie of Denis Diderot and Jean le Rond d'Alembert (published 1751–72), which had been inspired by Chambers's Cyclopaedia (first edition 1728). It went on sale 10 December.

The Britannica of this period was primarily a Scottish enterprise, and it is one of the most enduring legacies of the Scottish Enlightenment. In this era, the Britannica moved from being a three-volume set (1st edition) compiled by one young editor—William Smellie—to a 20-volume set written by numerous authorities. Several other encyclopaedias competed throughout this period, among them editions of Abraham Rees's Cyclopædia and Coleridge's Encyclopædia Metropolitana and David Brewster's Edinburgh Encyclopædia.

 1827–1901 
During the second era (7th–9th editions, 1827–1901), the Britannica was managed by the Edinburgh publishing firm A & C Black. Although some contributors were again recruited through friendships of the chief editors, notably Macvey Napier, others were attracted by the Britannica reputation. The contributors often came from other countries and included the world's most respected authorities in their fields. A general index of all articles was included for the first time in the 7th edition, a practice maintained until 1974.

Production of the 9th edition was overseen by Thomas Spencer Baynes, the first English-born editor-in-chief. Dubbed the "Scholar's Edition", the 9th edition is the most scholarly of all Britannicas. After 1880, Baynes was assisted by William Robertson Smith. No biographies of living persons were included. James Clerk Maxwell and Thomas Huxley were special advisors on science. However, by the close of the 19th century, the 9th edition was outdated, and the Britannica faced financial difficulties.

 1901–1973 

In the third era (10th–14th editions, 1901–1973), the Britannica was managed by American businessmen who introduced direct marketing and door-to-door sales. The American owners gradually simplified articles, making them less scholarly for a mass market. The 10th edition was an eleven-volume supplement (including one each of maps and an index) to the 9th, numbered as volumes 25–35, but the 11th edition was a completely new work, and is still praised for excellence; its owner, Horace Hooper, lavished enormous effort on its perfection.

When Hooper fell into financial difficulties, the Britannica was managed by Sears Roebuck for 18 years (1920–1923, 1928–1943). In 1932, the vice-president of Sears, Elkan Harrison Powell, assumed presidency of the Britannica; in 1936, he began the policy of continuous revision. This was a departure from earlier practice, in which the articles were not changed until a new edition was produced, at roughly 25-year intervals, some articles unchanged from earlier editions. Powell developed new educational products that built upon the Britannica reputation.

William Benton, then a vice president of the university, provided the working capital for its operation. The stock was divided between Benton and the university, with the university holding an option on the stock. Benton became chairman of the board and managed the Britannica until his death in 1973. Benton set up the Benton Foundation, which managed the Britannica until 1996, and whose sole beneficiary was the University of Chicago. In 1968, near the end of this era, the Britannica celebrated its bicentennial.

 1974–1994 

Under Mortimer J. Adler (member of the Board of Editors of Encyclopædia Britannica since its inception in 1949, and its chair from 1974; director of editorial planning for the 15th edition of Britannica from 1965), the Britannica sought not only to be a good reference work and educational tool, but to systematize all human knowledge.
 
 
 
 
 
 
  In response, the 15th edition was completely reorganized and indexed for a re-release in 1985. This second version of the 15th edition continued to be published and revised until the 2010 print version. The official title of the 15th edition is the New Encyclopædia Britannica, although it has also been promoted as Britannica 3.

On 9 March 1976 the US Federal Trade Commission entered an opinion and order enjoining Encyclopædia Britannica, Inc. from using: a) deceptive advertising practices in recruiting sales agents and obtaining sales leads, and b) deceptive sales practices in the door-to-door presentations of its sales agents.

 1994–present 

In the fifth era (1994–present), digital versions have been developed and released on optical media and online. In 1996, the Britannica was bought by Jacqui Safra at well below its estimated value, owing to the company's financial difficulties. Encyclopædia Britannica, Inc. split in 1999. One part retained the company name and developed the print version, and the other, Britannica.com Inc., developed digital versions. Since 2001, the two companies have shared a CEO, Ilan Yeshua, who has continued Powell's strategy of introducing new products with the Britannica name. In March 2012, Britannica's president, Jorge Cauz, announced that it would not produce any new print editions of the encyclopaedia, with the 2010 15th edition being the last. The company will focus only on the online edition and other educational tools.Britannica final print edition was in 2010, a 32-volume set. Britannica Global Edition was also printed in 2010, containing 30 volumes and 18,251 pages, with 8,500 photographs, maps, flags, and illustrations in smaller "compact" volumes, as well as over 40,000 articles written by scholars from across the world, including Nobel Prize winners. Unlike the 15th edition, it did not contain  and  sections, but ran A through Z as all editions up through the 14th had. The following is Britannica description of the work:

In 2020, Encyclopædia Britannica, Inc. released the Britannica All New Children's Encyclopedia: What We Know and What We Don't, an encyclopedia aimed primarily at younger readers, covering major topics. The encyclopedia was widely praised for bringing back the print format. It was Britannica's first encyclopedia for children since 1984.

 Dedications 
The Britannica was dedicated to the reigning British monarch from 1788 to 1901 and then, upon its sale to an American partnership, to the British monarch and the President of the United States. Thus, the 11th edition is "dedicated by Permission to His Majesty George the Fifth, King of Great Britain and Ireland and of the British Dominions beyond the Seas, Emperor of India, and to William Howard Taft, President of the United States of America." The order of the dedications has changed with the relative power of the United States and Britain, and with relative sales; the 1954 version of the 14th edition is "Dedicated by Permission to the Heads of the Two English-Speaking Peoples, Dwight David Eisenhower, President of the United States of America, and Her Majesty, Queen Elizabeth the Second." Consistent with this tradition, the 2007 version of the current 15th edition was "dedicated by permission to the current President of the United States of America, George W. Bush, and Her Majesty, Queen Elizabeth II", while the 2010 version of the current 15th edition is "dedicated by permission to Barack Obama, President of the United States of America, and Her Majesty Queen Elizabeth II."

 Edition summary 

 See also 

 Encyclopædia Britannica Films
 Great Books of the Western World List of encyclopedias by branch of knowledge
 List of encyclopedias by date
 
 List of online encyclopedias

 Notes 

 References 

 Further reading 

 Boyles, Denis. (2016) Everything Explained That Is Explainable: On the Creation of the Encyclopædia Britannica Celebrated Eleventh Edition, 1910–1911 (2016) online review 
 
 Greenstein, Shane, and Michelle Devereux (2006). "The Crisis at Encyclopædia Britannica" case history, Kellogg School of Management, Northwestern University.
 
 
 
 Lee, Timothy. Techdirt Interviews Britannica President Jorge Cauz'', Techdirt.com, 2 June 2008

External links 

 
 
 
 Encyclopaedia Britannica at the National Library of Scotland, first ten editions (and supplements) in PDF format.
 Encyclopaedia Britannica at the Online Books Page, currently including the 1st-13th editions in multiple formats.
 3rd edition, (1797, first volume, use search facility for others) at Bavarian State Library MDZ-Reader | Band | Encyclopaedia Britannica; or, a dictionary of arts, sciences, and miscellaneous literature | Encyclopaedia Britannica; or, a dictionary of arts, sciences, and miscellaneous literature
 7th edition (1842), fulltext via Hathi Trust
 8th edition (1860, index volume, use search facility for others) at Bavarian State Library MDZ-Reader | Band | The Encyclopaedia Britannica, or Dictionary of Arts, Sciences, and General Literature | The Encyclopaedia Britannica, or Dictionary of Arts, Sciences, and General Literature
 Scribner's 9th Edition (1878) archive.org
 9th and 10th (1902) editions 1902Encyclopedia.com

 
1768 books
1768 establishments in Scotland
American encyclopedias
English-language encyclopedias
History of Edinburgh
Publications established in 1768
Scottish Enlightenment
Scottish encyclopedias
American online encyclopedias
British online encyclopedias